Freestyle skiing at the 2011 Winter Universiade will be held at the Palandöken Mountain in Erzurum, Turkey. The four events are scheduled for January 28 - February 5, 2011.

Men's events

Women's events

Medals table

References

2011 in freestyle skiing
Freestyle skiing
Skiing competitions in Turkey
2011